Sir Paul Collier,  (born 23 April 1949) is a British development economist who serves as the Professor of Economics and Public Policy in the Blavatnik School of Government and the director of the International Growth Centre. He currently is a Professeur invité at Sciences Po and a Professorial Fellow of St Antony's College, Oxford. He has served as a senior advisor to the Blair Commission for Africa and was the Director of the Development Research Group at the World Bank between 1998 and 2003.

Early life and education
Collier was born on 23 April 1949. Collier’s great-grandfather, Karl Hellenschmidt, was a German immigrant to the UK. During World War I, Collier’s grandfather, Karl Hellenschmidt Jr, changed his surname from Hellenschmidt to Collier.

Collier was brought up in Sheffield where he attended King Edward VII School and studied PPE at the University of Oxford.

Academic career
He was a founder of the Centre for the Study of African Economies and remained its Director from 1989 until 2014. From 1998 until 2003 he was the director of the Development Research Group of the World Bank. In 2010 and 2011, he was named by Foreign Policy magazine on its list of top global thinkers. Collier currently serves on the advisory board of Academics Stand Against Poverty (ASAP).

Collier is a specialist in the political, economic and developmental predicaments of low-income countries.  His research covers the causes and consequences of civil war; the effects of aid and the problems of democracy in low-income and natural resources rich societies; urbanization in low-income countries; private investment in African infrastructure and changing organizational cultures.

In 1988 he was awarded the Edgar Graham Book Prize for the co-written Labour and poverty in rural Tanzania: Ujamaa and rural development in the United Republic of Tanzania.

The Bottom Billion: Why the Poorest Countries are Failing and What Can Be Done About It, has been compared to Jeffrey Sachs's The End of Poverty and William Easterly's The White Man's Burden, two influential books, which like Collier's book, discuss the pros and cons of development aid to developing countries.

His 2010 book The Plundered Planet is encapsulated in his formulas:
Nature – Technology + Regulation = Starvation
Nature + Technology – Regulation = Plunder
Nature + Technology + Regulation (Good governance) = Prosperity

The book describes itself as an attempt at a middle way between the extremism of "Ostriches" (denialism, particularly climate change denial) and "Environmental Romanticism" (for example, anti-genetically modified organisms movements in Europe).  The book is about sustainable management in relation with the geo-politics of global warming, with an attempt to avoid a global tragedy of the commons, with the prime example of overfishing.  In it he builds upon a legacy of the economic psychology of greed and fear, from early Utilitarianism (Jeremy Bentham) to more recently the Stern Review.

Honours
Collier was appointed Commander of the Order of the British Empire (CBE) in the 2008 Birthday Honours and knighted in the 2014 New Year Honours for services to promoting research and policy change in Africa.

In November 2014, Collier was awarded the President's Medal by the British Academy, for "his pioneering contribution in bringing ideas from research in to policy within the field of African economics." In July 2017, Collier was elected a Fellow of the British Academy (FBA), the United Kingdom's national academy for the humanities and social sciences.

Work

Books 
 Labour and Poverty in Rural Tanzania: Ujamaa and Rural Development in the United Republic of Tanzania, Oxford University Press, New York, 1991 .
 The Bottom Billion: Why the Poorest Countries are Failing and What Can Be Done About It, Oxford University Press, 2007 .
 Wars, Guns and Votes: Democracy in Dangerous Places, Harper, March 2009 .
 The Plundered Planet: Why We Must, and How We Can, Manage Nature for Global Prosperity, Oxford University Press, 2010 .
 Plundered Nations?: Successes and Failures in Natural Resource Extraction co-edited with Anthony J. Venables, Palgrave Macmillan UK, 2011 .
 Exodus: How Migration is Changing Our World, Oxford University Press, October 2013 .
 Refuge: Rethinking Refugee Policy in a Changing World with Alexander Betts, Oxford University Press, September 2017 .
 The Future of Capitalism: Facing the New Anxieties, Allen Lane, April 2018 .
 Greed Is Dead: Politics After Individualism with John Kay, July 2020 978-0241467954

Selected articles 
 (with Anke Hoeffler) 'On economic causes of civil war' Oxford Economic Papers, vol 50 issue 4, 1998, pp. 563–573.
(with V. L. Elliott, Håvard Hegre, Anke Hoeffler, Marta Reynal-Querol, Nicholas Sambanis) 'Breaking the Conflict Trap: Civil War and Development Policy' "World Bank Policy Research Report," 2003. 
 (with Anke Hoeffler) 'Greed and grievance in civil war' Oxford Economic Papers, vol 56 issue 4, 2004, pp. 563–595.
 (with Lisa Chauvet and Haavard Hegre) 'The Security Challenge in Conflict-Prone Countries', Copenhagen Consensus 2008 Challenge Paper, 2008.

Video 
 The Royal Economic Society's 2006 Annual Public Lecture, by Collier at the (Royal Economic Society)
 Interview with Fareed Zakaria on Foreign Exchange
 TED Conference, Paul Collier on "The Bottom Billion"
 TED Conference, Paul Collier's new rules for rebuilding a broken nation
 Why social science should integrate culture and how to do it?, at the Blavatnik School of Government, Oxford University, January 2017

Press 
 Review of The Plundered Planet by the Financial Times
 Review of the Bottom Billion by the Financial Times
 Review of the Bottom Billion in The New York Times
 Samuel Grove, "The Bottom of the Barrel: A Review of Paul Collier's The Bottom Billion: Why the Poorest Countries Are Failing and What Can Be Done about It."

See also 
 Environmental politics

References

External links 

 Paul Collier's home page at the Blavatnik School of Government
 Links to downloadable research papers on Africa, Aid, Conflict, Political Economy and other topics
 Interview with Paul Collier by J. Tyler Dickovick
 Interview with the Oxonian Review in March 2009
 Video of recent talk at Oxford University – "The Bottom Billion"
 
 TED Talks: Paul Collier: The "bottom billion" (TED2008)
 
 

1949 births
British economists
Climate economists
Commanders of the Order of the British Empire
Development specialists
Fellows of St Antony's College, Oxford
Fellows of Trinity College, Oxford
Knights Bachelor
Living people
People educated at King Edward VII School, Sheffield
Sustainability advocates
Recipients of the President's Medal (British Academy)
Fellows of the British Academy
British people of German descent